Ballarini is an Italian surname. Notable people with the surname include:

 Bruno Ballarini (1937–2015), Italian footballer
 Joe Ballarini, American film director, screenwriter and author
 Marco Ballarini, Italian footballer
 Paolo Ballarini, 18th-century Italian painter

See also
 Ballerini

Italian-language surnames